The National Ice Hockey Federation of the Republic of Moldova is the governing body of ice hockey in Moldova. It is a member of the International Ice Hockey Federation.

References

External links
 International Ice Hockey Federation
  Official website of the National Ice Hockey Federation of the Republic of Moldova
  Site-ul oficial al Federației Naționale de Hochei pe Gheață din Republica Moldova
  Официальный сайт Национальной федерации хоккея на льду Республики Молдова

Moldova
Moldova
 
Ice Hockey